"Shoo Shoo Baby" is a popular song written by Phil Moore.  The song was made famous by The Andrews Sisters, as they sang it in the 1943 film Three Cheers for the Boys. "Shoo, Shoo Baby" was a big hit for the trio in 1944, reaching No. 6 in the chart. Their version features a jazzy vocal pop arrangement typical of the time, with a key hook provided by the horns. It was and has appeared on many albums of 1940s music.

Other versions
Ella Mae Morse also recorded this song in 1943, with Dick Walters and His Orchestra. Released on Capitol Records, the single went to number four on the pop chart and number one on the R&B charts for 2 weeks in December 1943.

It was also recorded by Glenn Miller with vocals performed by the Crew Chiefs.

Frank Sinatra recorded the song in the 1940s.

In 1984, the Norwegian swing/pop duo Bobbysocks! covered the song on their self-titled debut LP.

The R&B girl group Mis-Teeq covered the song for the soundtrack to the Vanguard Animation film Valiant in 2005. It was the last track Mis-Teeq recorded before they split to pursue solo careers.

In popular culture
A version of the song by an uncredited male singer is played over a radio at the Heavenly trial of the airman in the 1946 film A Matter of Life and Death as a symbol of modern America.

This song was also the inspiration for the naming of the Shoo Shoo Baby, a B-17 Flying Fortress which served during World War II.

References

1943 songs
1944 singles